James Benjamin Brown  (15 October 1902 – 1965) was an English amateur footballer who played in the Football League as a goalkeeper for Darlington in the 1920s. He was the club's third-choice goalkeeper, behind Andy Greig and John Ward, and made only five appearances in Darlington's first two seasons in the Third Division North, three in 1921–22 and two in 1922–23. Before joining Darlington he played non-league football for Barnard Castle United.

References

1902 births
1965 deaths
People from Barnard Castle
Footballers from County Durham
English footballers
Association football goalkeepers
Darlington F.C. players
English Football League players
Place of death missing